Criticism of the Israeli government, often referred to simply as criticism of Israel, is a subject of journalistic and scholarly commentary and research within the scope of international relations theory, expressed in terms of political science. Within the scope of global aspirations for a community of nations, Israel has faced international criticism since its declaration of independence in 1948 relating to a variety of topics, both historical and contemporary.

The government of Israel has been criticized for issues regarding Israeli settlements in the Palestinian territories, its treatment of Palestinians, the conduct of the Israeli Defense Forces in the Arab–Israeli conflict, and the blockade of the Gaza Strip, with its impact on the economy of the Palestinian territories, the country's nuclear weapons program, and its targeted killings program. Other criticized long-standing issues include: the refusal to allow post-war Palestinian refugees to return to their homes, and the prolonged occupation of territories gained in war and the construction of settlements therein. Israel's status as a representative democracy has also been questioned because Israeli residents of the occupied territories are allowed to vote in Israel's elections while Palestinian residents are not.

Criticisms of Israeli policies come from several groups: primarily from activists, within Israel and worldwide, the United Nations and other non-governmental organizations including European churches, and mass media. Media bias is often claimed by both sides of the debate. Since 2003, the UN has issued 232 resolutions with respect to Israel, 40% of all resolutions issued by the UN over the period and more than six times that of the second placed country, Sudan.

Some critics of the Israeli government seek to delegitimize Israel's right to exist, which has led to a debate regarding at what point criticism of the Israeli government crosses the line to antisemitism. One of the effects of international criticism has been the impact on the social psychology of the Israeli Jewish public—according to a survey, more than half of Israelis believe "the whole world is against us", and three quarters of Israelis believe "that no matter what Israel does or how far it goes towards resolving the conflict with the Palestinians, the world will continue to criticize Israel".

Subjects of criticism

Palestinian refugees

Palestinian refugees are defined by the UN as Arabs who lived in Palestine for at least two years prior to 1948 and their descendants, and who fled or were expelled from their homes during and after the 1948 Palestine War.

The causes and responsibilities of the exodus are a matter of controversy among historians and commentators of the conflict. Whereas historians now agree on most of the events of that period, there remains disagreement as to whether the exodus was the result of a plan designed before or during the war by Zionist leaders or was an unintended consequence of the war.

Significant international pressure was placed on both sides during the 1949 Lausanne Conference to resolve the refugee crisis. The parties signed a joint protocol on the framework for a comprehensive peace, which included territories, refugees, and Jerusalem, in which Israel agreed "in principle" to allow the return of all of the Palestinian refugees. According to New Historian Ilan Pappe, this Israeli agreement was made under pressure from the United States, and because the Israelis wanted United Nations membership, which required Israeli agreement to allow the return of all refugees. Once Israel was admitted to the UN, it retreated from the protocol it had signed because it was completely satisfied with the status quo and saw no need to make any concessions with regard to the refugees or on boundary questions. This led to significant and sustained international criticism.

Allegations of ethnic cleansing
"New Historian" Ilan Pappe argued in The Ethnic Cleansing of Palestine that Israel's policy between 1947 and 1949, when "over 400 Palestinian villages were deliberately destroyed, civilians were massacred, and around a million men, women, and children were expelled from their homes at gunpoint" is best described as ethnic cleansing. However, Pappe's work has been subject to significant criticism and allegations of fabrication by other historians.

For example, Israeli historian Benny Morris called Pappe "At best ... one of the world's sloppiest historians; at worst, one of the most dishonest." When asked about the 1948 Palestinian expulsion from Lydda and Ramle, he responded "There are circumstances in history that justify ethnic cleansing. I know that this term is completely negative in the discourse of the 21st century, but when the choice is between ethnic cleansing and genocide – the annihilation of your people – I prefer ethnic cleansing. [...] There was no choice but to expel that population. It was necessary to cleanse the hinterland and cleanse the border areas and cleanse the main roads. It was necessary to cleanse the villages from which our convoys and our settlements were fired on." He also added in 2008, that "There was no Zionist 'plan' or blanket policy of evicting the Arab population, or of 'ethnic cleansing'. Plan Dalet (Plan D), of 10 March 1948 ... was the master plan ... to counter the expected pan-Arab assault on the emergent Jewish state".

Occupation and annexation of neighboring territories

The territories occupied by Israel from Egypt, Jordan, and Syria after the Six-Day War of 1967 have been designated as occupied territory by the United Nations and many other international organisations, governments and others. They consist of the West Bank and much of the Golan Heights. From the Six-Day War until 1982, the Sinai Peninsula was occupied by Israel, but it was returned to Egypt in the Egypt–Israel peace treaty. The Gaza Strip was also occupied by Israel until its unilateral disengagement. UN Security Council resolution 242, emphasized "the inadmissibility of the acquisition of territory by war," setting the stage for controversy on the legal status of areas captured in 1967, and in 1948. There are two interpretations of international law on this matter:

The Israeli position:
 The wars in 1956 and 1967 were waged by Israel to ensure the state's survival. As most hostilities were initiated by the Arab side, Israel had to fight and win these wars in order to ensure the state's sovereignty and safety. Territories captured in the course of those wars are therefore legitimately under Israeli administration for both security reasons and to deter hostile states from belligerence.
In the absence of peace treaties between all the parties at war, Israel has under all circumstances the right to maintain control of the captured territories. Their ultimate disposition should be a result of peace treaties, and not a condition for them. Even so, Israel asserts that:
The 1956 war was caused by a pattern of Egyptian belligerence against Israel, culminating with the nationalization of the Suez Canal and the blockage of the canal for Israeli traffic in violation of the Convention of Constantinople and other relevant treaties, in their view a clear casus belli (i.e., an act justifying war)
The 1967 war was similarly caused by the closing of the Straits of Tiran, the rejection of UN forces in the Sinai desert, and the redeployment of Egyptian forces. Jordan and Syria entered the war in spite of Israeli efforts to keep these frontiers peaceful.
The 1973 war was a surprise attack against Israel by Syria and Egypt.
The Arab position:
The 1956 war was a result of a conspiracy between France, the United Kingdom and Israel in violation of Egypt's sovereignty.  Egypt claimed several legal justifications for refusing Israel use of the Suez Canal, including the right of self-defence.
The war in 1967 was an unprovoked act of aggression aimed at expanding the boundaries of Israel, and the territories captured during this war are illegally occupied.
As a result, the territories must be ceded in order for peace to be achieved.

Israel's annexation of East Jerusalem and the Golan Heights in 1980-1 by the Jerusalem Law and the Golan Heights Law has not been recognised by any other country. The Palestinian Authority, the EU, and the UN Security Council consider East Jerusalem to be part of the West Bank, a position disputed by Israel. International bodies such as the United Nations have condemned the Jerusalem Law as a violation of the Fourth Geneva Convention and therefore hold that the establishment of the city as Israel's capital is against international law.  Consequently, countries have established embassies to Israel's government outside of Jerusalem.

Israel unilaterally disengaged from Gaza in September 2005, and declared itself no longer to be in occupation of the Strip. This has been contested by the UN, which though not declaring Gaza "occupied" under the legal definition, has referred to Gaza under the nomenclature of "Occupied Palestinian Territories". Some groups do assert that Gaza is legally occupied.

Alleged lack of democracy
Despite the fact that Israeli security legislation for Palestinian territories does not state that, military law applies only to Arab residents of the territories, and not to Jews or to Israeli citizens. Israeli citizens are governed by Israeli law whereas Palestinians are governed by military law.

Some Israeli individuals such as Avraham Burg, Ilan Pappé, Gershom Gorenberg, David Remnick, Oren Yiftachel, and Miko Peled and organisations as Human Rights Watch, B'tselem, Peace Now and others have questioned Israel's status as a democracy. These questions focus on the lack of democracy in the Israeli-occupied territories, not Israel proper. Such criticisms are based on the belief that both Israeli citizens in settlements and Palestinians should be given the right to suffrage, considering the Palestinians are effectively under Israeli authority and thus should benefit from it. They share a concern that the occupation of the territories is not temporary, given the over forty-five year duration and the large and the permanent nature of the Israeli settlements.

Israeli settlements

The participating High Contracting Parties to the Fourth Geneva Convention, numerous UN resolutions, the International Court of Justice and other instances have ruled that Israel's policy of establishing civilian settlements in territories considered occupied, including in East Jerusalem, is illegal. Israel disputes the notion that the West Bank and in particular East Jerusalem are occupied under international law, though this view is dismissed internationally.

Israel's settlement policy has drawn harsh criticism from the United States and the European Union.

Ali Jarbawi called the policy as "one of the only remaining settler-colonial occupations in the world today". In his book Hollow Land: Israel's Architecture of Occupation, Eyal Weizman describes Israel's policy as a "political system at the heart of this complex and terrifying project of late-modern colonial occupation".

The international community criticized Israel for "failing to protect the Palestinian population" from Israeli settler violence.

Human rights

Human Rights Watch (HRW) has said Israel operates a "two-tier" judicial system in areas of the occupied Palestinian territories it administers, to an effect which provides preferential services, development, and benefits for Israelis living in settlements in the occupied territories while imposing harsh conditions on Palestinians and other non-Israeli citizens. In some cases Israel has acknowledged differential treatment of Palestinians and Israelis, such as having separate roads for both communities and operating checkpoints for Palestinians, asserting that the measures are necessary to protect Israelis from attacks by Palestinian armed groups. In 2011, the Israeli parliament passed a law criminalizing participation in boycotts of Israeli settlements. The law drew criticism from the EU, the United States and the Anti-Defamation League.

Imprisonment

Amnesty International reported that in 2009 hundreds of Palestinians were detained and held incommunicado for extended periods of time by Israel. While most were later released without charge, hundreds were tried before military courts whose procedures often failed to meet international standards for fair trial. According to Amnesty, almost all Palestinian prisoners were held in  violation of international humanitarian law, which prohibits the transfer of detainees to the territory of the occupying power (i.e., Israel proper). It claimed that about 300 minors and 550 adults were held without charge or trial for more than a year.

In 2011, UN Secretary-General Ban Ki-Moon said Israel held thousands of Palestinians as prisoners, and called on Israel to release them. Ban said the release of political prisoners would "serve as a significant confidence-building measure" and boost prospects of peace in the region. Also Amnesty International has called on Israel to release political prisoners, saying "all political prisoners held without charge or trial should be tried in fair trials or immediately released". Israel objects to releasing prisoners, many of whom have been convicted by Israeli courts for violent crimes such as murder. However, several prisoner release deals have been conducted by Israel as a gesture in negotiations, many which involved the release of hundreds or more prisoners.

According to Amnesty International, methods of torture used by Israel on Palestinian prisoners include prolonged tying in painful stress positions, sleep deprivation and threats to harm detainees’ families. Beatings and other ill-treatment of detainees are common during and following arrest and during transfer from one location to another.

Treatment of ethnic and religious minorities

Organizations such as Amnesty International, the Association for Civil Rights in Israel (ACRI), the Israeli government-appointed Or Commission, and  the United States Department of State have published reports that document racism and discrimination directed towards racial and ethnic groups in Israel.

According to a study commissioned by Israel's Courts administration and Israel Bar Association, Arab Israelis who have been charged with certain types of crime are more likely than their Jewish counterparts to be convicted, and once convicted they are more likely to be sent to prison. The study also found differences in lengths of prison sentences given, with the average prison sentence at nine and a half months for Jews and 14 months for Arabs.

Rights groups have said that anti-discrimination employment laws in Israel are rarely enforced. A coalition of nine Israeli rights groups has opposed a practice under which companies can advertise their policy to hire only Jewish Israelis, and no Arab Israelis. Companies advertising under a "Hebrew labor" banner adhere to a segregated employment philosophy derived from a practice by Jewish immigrants in Palestine in the first half of the 20th century which was meant to strengthen emerging Israeli industry from British and Arab influence.

Stagnating peace process
In February 2011, Netanyahu called German Chancellor Angela Merkel to complain about Germany's vote in favor of a resolution at the United Nations Security Council to declare Israeli settlements to be illegal and she responded "How dare you!  You are the one who disappointed us. You haven't made a single step to advance peace."  A few days later veteran Israeli diplomat Ilan Baruch resigned saying that Netanyahu's policies were leading to Israel's delegitimization.

Military practices

Human shield allegations
The IDF acknowledged using the "Neighbor Procedure” or the “Early Warning Procedure”, in which the IDF would encourage a Palestinian acquaintance of a wanted man to try to convince him to surrender. This practice was criticized by some as using "human shields", an allegation the IDF denied, saying that it never forced people into carrying out the Neighbor Procedure; and that Palestinians volunteered to prevent excess loss of life.
Amnesty International and Human Rights Watch are among the groups who made the "human shield" comparison. The Israeli  group B'Tselem also made the comparison, saying that "for a long period of time following the outbreak of the second intifada Operation Defensive Shield, in April 2002, the IDF systematically used Palestinian civilians as human shields, forcing them to carry out military actions which threatened their lives". The Neighbor Procedure was outlawed by the Supreme Court of Israel in 2005 but some groups say the IDF continues to use it, although they say the number of instances has dropped sharply.

Possession of weapons of mass destruction

Israel is seen to possess a nuclear arsenal of about 150 weapons, and has been criticised for maintaining nuclear weapons and for not agreeing to a nuclear-free Middle East zone. In September 2009, the IAEA passed a resolution that "expresses concern about the Israeli nuclear capabilities, and calls upon Israel to accede to the NPT and place all its nuclear facilities under comprehensive IAEA safeguards..."

Israel has signed the Chemical Weapons Convention but not ratified it, citing neighbouring states that have not done so either. Israel is widely believed to have chemical weapons, but officials have never directly admitted it, although in 1990 Science Minister Yuval Neeman threatened to retaliate against an Iraqi chemical-weapons strike "with the same merchandise". Israel has not signed the Biological Weapons Convention.

Targeted killings of terrorists

Amnesty International has condemned Israel's policy of assassinations targeting individuals. Israeli officials have admitted that the policy exists and is being pursued, saying it helps prevent acts of terrorism from being committed against Israel. The United States  has a very similar policy. Criticism has also been raised from some on the Israeli left, who say assassination policy is "gangster behavior" unbecoming of a government and is against Israeli law. Israel's Supreme Court has ruled that assassinations are illegal, but leaked documents suggest that Israel's army has ignored the ruling.

Judaization of Jerusalem

The term Judaization of Jerusalem refers to the view that Israel has sought to transform the physical and demographic landscape of Jerusalem to correspond with a vision of a united and fundamentally Jewish Jerusalem under Israeli sovereignty.

The United Nations has criticised Israel's efforts to change the demographic makeup of Jerusalem in several resolutions. All legislative and administrative measures taken by Israel, which have altered or aimed to alter the character, legal status and demographic composition of Jerusalem, are described by the UN as "null and void" and having "no validity whatsoever". Richard Falk, an investigator with the U.N. Human Rights Council, said that Israel's expansion of East Jerusalem settlements and evictions of Palestinian residents can "only be described in its cumulative impact as a form of ethnic cleansing".

In a 2008 report, John Dugard, independent investigator for the United Nations Human Rights Council, cites the Judaization of Jerusalem among many examples of Israeli policies "of colonialism, apartheid or occupation" that create a context in which Palestinian terrorism is "an inevitable consequence".

The Law of Return
Israel has enacted a Law of Return that allows Jews a fast-track to Israeli citizenship. Palestinian refugees cannot apply for Israeli citizenship under the law since they are not Jewish, though they can apply for Israeli citizenship through the conventional channel. The law has drawn criticism from the Cairo Institute for Human Rights Studies which says the law is a "main example of Israeli laws that discriminate against Palestinian Arabs". The American-Arab Anti-Discrimination Committee says the contrast between the Law of Return and Israeli opposition to the right of return of Palestinian refugees exhibits "barefaced racism". More than 1,000 American Jews have backed a campaign entitled “Breaking the Law of Return”, saying the Law of Return creates an ethnically exclusive citizenship, which they see as unjust.

Critics claim that the guaranteed right for Jews to immigrate to Israel is discriminatory to non-Jews and therefore runs counter to the democratic value of equality under the law.

Current government
Former Israeli Prime Minister Ehud Barak stated the current Israeli government is “infected by seeds of fascism” and "needs to be brought down."  Zionist Union MK Tzipi Livni stated the government was in a state of "crisis — not only of leadership but of ethics.”

Criticism at the United Nations

The UN has issued 232 resolutions with respect to Israel since 2003, representing 40% of all resolutions issued by the UN over the period and more than six times that of the second placed country, Sudan.

According to testimony by the pro-Israel human rights NGO UN Watch to the United States Congress in January 2011 with respect to the United Nations Human Rights Council, Israel has been the focus of 70% of approximately 50 condemnatory resolutions by the council, 60% of the ten Special Sessions of the council and 100% of the council's five fact-finding missions or inquiries.

Analogies

Accusations of apartheid

Comparisons between apartheid South Africa and Israel are increasingly made. Israelis recoil at the analogy, but the parallel is widely drawn in international circles.

The Association for Civil Rights in Israel, a group in Israel with support from several EU states, asserted in 2008 that the separate road networks in the West Bank for Israelis and Palestinians, the expansion of Jewish settlements, restriction of the growth of Palestinian towns and discriminatory granting of services, budgets and access to natural resources are "a blatant violation of the principle of equality and in many ways reminiscent of the Apartheid regime in South Africa".

Israel has also been accused of apartheid by Michael Ben-Yair, Israel's attorney-general from 1993 to 1996. and Shulamit Aloni, who served as Minister for Education under Yitzhak Rabin.

In April 2021, Human Rights Watch accused Israeli officials of the crimes of apartheid and persecution under international law and called for an International Criminal Court investigation into these claims.

Comparisons with Nazi Germany

Some key aspects of Israeli society are sometimes compared to Nazi Germany, directly or by allusion. Examples include: equating the Gaza Strip with concentration camps in Nazi-occupied Europe. The IHRA Working Definition of Antisemitism defines such comparisons as antisemitic.

Following the 1967 Six-Day War, the Soviet Union compared Israeli tactics to those of Nazi Germany. A similar comparison was made by the Israeli Arab author Nimer Nimer. Yeshayahu Leibowitz, Israeli public intellectual, scientist, and Orthodox Jew, warned in 1982 that if the occupation continued, Israel would be in danger of succumbing to "Judeo-Nazism".

In 1984, author Israel Stockman-Shomron noted Nazi allusions in articles critical of Israel in publications including The Christian Science Monitor, The Washington Post and The New York Times.

Examples since the Second Intifada (a term describing events generally thought of as taking place from 2000 to 2005) include:
In 2000, Nur Masalha characterized Israel's occupation of Palestine territories as comparable to the Nazi Lebensraum (living space) policy of gaining land and materials for the benefit of Germans. 
In 2002, Portuguese Nobel Prize-winning author Jose Saramago compared conditions in Ramallah to concentration camps and, in conversation with a journalist, commented that the gas-chambers would "be here before long". 
In 2004, writer Josie Sandercock described Gaza as the "largest concentration camp in the world". In 2005, Chilean author Luis Sepulveda wrote: "In Auschwitz and Mauthausen, in Sabra, Shatila, and Gaza, Zionism and Nazism go hand in hand". 
In 2006, Arab journalist Jihad al-Khazin wrote an article in Al-Hayat comparing Ehud Olmert to Hitler.
In 2009, British Member of Parliament Gerald Kaufman suggested that an Israeli justification for the deaths of 1,000 Palestinians on the grounds that "500 of them were militants" represented "the reply of a Nazi", and that the same logic could have been applied in the Warsaw Ghetto. 
In 2009, Professor William I. Robinson was accused by the Anti-Defamation League of anti-Semitism and misconduct because his classroom materials included a visual image comparison of the Israeli attacks on Gaza to the Warsaw Ghetto. Scholars for Peace in the Middle East supported Robinson, citing academic freedom.
In 2009 and 2010, two United Nations special rapporteurs, Richard Falk and Jean Ziegler, were criticised by pro-Israel commentators for making comparisons between policies of the Israeli government and those of Nazi Germany.
In 2010, Israeli professor Gavriel Salomon protested against Israeli loyalty-oath legislation, and compared Israel to Nazi Germany, adding: "I am not talking about the death camps, but about the year 1935. There were no camps yet but there were racist laws. And we are heading forward towards these kinds of laws."
In 2013, musician Roger Waters said in an American online interview, "The parallels with what went on in the 1930s in Germany are so crushingly obvious."
In 2015, during an interview on Kol Yisrael, Dr. Ofer Cassif, a political science lecturer at the Hebrew University of Jerusalem, said: "I think it's fair to compare Israel to Germany in the 1930s, and not to the years of genocide... we have moved into a completely different phase in the history of this country. We are now the Germany of the 1930s."
In 2018, after the Nation-State Law was passed, President of Turkey Recep Tayyip Erdoğan said the "spirit of Hitler" lives on in Israel. He said the law is designed to strengthen Israel's identity as the "national home of the Jewish people" which showed that the soul of the Nazi leader had "risen again within some of Israel's officials". He added: "There's no difference between Hitler's obsession with a pure race and the understanding that these ancient lands are just for the Jews."
Hajo Meyer, physicist and Jewish Holocaust survivor from Auschwitz, spent the final years of his life comparing Israel's treatment of Palestinians to the Nazis in Germany.

The European Forum on Anti-Semitism stated that "drawing comparisons of contemporary Israeli policy to that of the Nazis" amounted to anti-Semitism. In 2006, the British All-Party Parliamentary Group against Antisemitism recommended that the UK Government adopt the same stance. Sociologist David Hirsh accuses anti-Zionists of double standards in their criticism of Israel, and notes that other states carry out policies similar to those of Israel without those policies being described as "Nazi". He suggests that to describe Israel as engaged in "genocide" carries an unspoken accusation comparison with the Holocaust and an equation of Zionism with Nazism. British author Howard Jacobson has suggested that comparisons between conditions faced by Palestinians and those of the Warsaw Ghetto are intended "to wound Jews in their recent and most anguished history and to punish them with their own grief" and are a form of Holocaust denial which accepts the reality of Jewish suffering but accuses Jews "of trying to profit from it". "It is as though," he says, "by a reversal of the usual laws of cause and effect, Jewish actions of today prove that Jews had it coming to them yesterday."

In May 2018, Jewish Voice for Labour and Free Speech on Israel produced a definition of antisemitism. In notes posted on the Jewish Voice for Labour website they argued that comparing Israel's actions to those of the Nazis should not automatically be seen as antisemitic: "Drawing such parallels can undoubtedly cause offence, but potent historical events and experiences are always key reference points in political debate. Whether such comparisons are anti-Semitic must be judged on their substantive content, and on the inferences that can reasonably be drawn about the motivation for making them, rather than on the likely degree of offence caused." In September, JVL contributed to the consultation on Labour's new code of conduct rejecting suggestions that comparisons between Israel and "features of pre-war Nazi Germany" or apartheid-era South Africa were "inherently antisemitic", and that "Such comparisons are only anti-Semitic if they show prejudice, hostility or hatred against Jews as Jews."

Criticism of Israel and antisemitism

Some criticisms of Israel or Israeli policies have been characterized as anti-Semitic.   Proponents of the concept of New Antisemitism, such as Phyllis Chesler, Gabriel Schoenfeld and Mortimer Zuckerman, argue that, since the 1967 Six-Day War, many criticisms of Israel are veiled attacks on Jews and hence are essentially antisemitic. Abba Eban, Robert S. Wistrich, and Joschka Fischer focus on criticism of Zionism, and contend that some forms of anti-Zionism, particularly attacks on Israel's right to exist, are anti-Semitic in nature.

Critics of this view often portray this view as an equation of criticism with anti-Semitism.  Some critics of Israel or Israeli policies, including  Ralph Nader, Jenny Tonge, Noam Chomsky, and Desmond Tutu suggest that equating criticism of Israel with antisemitism is inappropriate or inaccurate.  Other critics, such as John Mearsheimer, Alexander Cockburn, Norman Finkelstein, and William I. Robinson, claim that supporters of Israel sometimes equate criticism of Israel with anti-Semitism in a deliberate attempt to prevent legitimate criticism of Israel and discredit critics.

However, proponents of the view usually argue that the equation of criticism with antisemitism is rarely made.  For example, Alvin H. Rosenfeld considers this argument to be disingenuous, dismissing it as "the ubiquitous rubric 'criticism of Israel,'" He states that "vigorous discussion of Israeli policy and actions is not in question," but rather statements that go well beyond legitimate criticism "and call into question Israel's right to continued existence."  Alan Dershowitz claims that some enemies of Israel pretend to be victimized by accusations of anti-Semitism, in order to garner support for their position.

Dina Porat (head of the Institute for Study of Anti-semitism and Racism at Tel-Aviv University) characterizes some anti-Zionist ideals as anti-Semitic, because they amount to singling-out Jews for special treatment, while all other comparable groups of people are entitled to create and maintain a homeland.  She contends that anti-Zionism is anti-Semitic because it is discriminatory: "...antisemitism is involved when the belief is articulated that of all the peoples on the globe (including the Palestinians), only the Jews should not have the right to self-determination in a land of their own. Hannah Rosenthal of the United States State Department said UN double standards against Israel constitute "profound anti-semitism".  However, many commentators have suggested singling out Israel for disproportionate criticism is warranted as a result of Israel's actions.

Distinguishing legitimate criticism of Israel from antisemitism
The   European Monitoring Centre on Racism and Xenophobia (EUMC) prepared a report in 2003 that distinguished criticism of Israel from anti-Semitism by testing whether "Israel is seen as being a representative of 'the Jew'":  if the speaker is considering Israel as a representative of Jews in general, then anti-Semitism is deemed to be underlying the criticism.

Natan Sharansky, former Soviet dissident and Israeli Minister, suggested a three-part test to distinguish legitimate criticism of Israel from anti-Semitic attacks.    Sharansky's tests that identify a criticism as anti-Semitic are:
Demonization - when Israeli actions are blown so far out of proportion that the account paints Israel as the embodiment of all evil.
Double Standards - when Israel is criticized soundly for an action or policy that any other government would be viewed as justified in doing, like protecting its citizens from terrorism.
Delegitimization: a denial of Israel's right to exist or the right of the Jewish people to live securely in a homeland.

Demonization and double standards are often used as evidence of anti-Semitism in relation to criticism of Israel. Sharansky believes that some criticisms involve applying an especially high moral standard to Israel, higher than applied to other countries (particularly compared to surrounding countries), yet the only special characteristic of Israel is that it is a Jewish state, hence there is an element of anti-Semitism.

Delegitimization was a factor addressed by Abba Eban, who claimed that efforts to deny "the equal rights of the Jewish people its lawful sovereignty within the community of nations" constituted anti-Semitism.

European Union 2006 report on antisemitism 
The  European Monitoring Centre on Racism and Xenophobia (EUMC, recently renamed to Fundamental Rights Agency) published a draft of an operational definition of antisemitism  called Working Definition of Antisemitism which accompanied a report by the EUMC on report that summarized antisemitism in Europe.  The EUMC working definition included five kinds of behaviors related to criticism of Israel that might be manifestations of antisemitism:
 Denying the Jewish people their right to self-determination, e.g., by claiming that the existence of a State of Israel is a racist endeavor.
 Applying double standards by requiring of it a behavior not expected or demanded of any other democratic nation.
 Using the symbols and images associated with classic antisemitism (e.g., claims of Jews killing Jesus or blood libel) to characterize Israel or Israelis.
 Drawing comparisons of contemporary Israeli policy to that of the Nazis.
 Holding Jews collectively responsible for actions of the state of Israel.

This part of the definition has proved highly contentious and is seen by many as attempting to proscribe legitimate criticism of the human rights record of the Israeli Government by attempting to bring any criticism of Israel into the category of antisemitism, and as not sufficiently distinguishing between criticism of Israeli actions and criticism of Zionism as a political ideology, on the one hand, and racially based violence towards, discrimination against, or abuse of, Jews.

Paul Igansky points out that one of the EUMC anti-Semitic behaviors, comparisons between Israeli policy and those of the Nazis, is "arguably not intrinsically antisemitic", and that the context in which they are made is critical. Igansky illustrates this with the incident where Israeli prime minister Yitzhak Rabin was described by fellow Jewish Israelis as cooperating with the Nazis, and depicted wearing an SS uniform. According to Igansky, the "Nazi" label was merely used as "charged political rhetoric" in this case.

EISCA 2009 report on criticism of Israel
Following the 2006 EUMC  report, the European Institute for the Study of Contemporary Antisemitism (EISCA) published a report in 2009 entitled Understanding and Addressing the ‘Nazi Card' - Intervening Against Antisemitic Discourse which discussed comparisons of Israel with Nazi Germany.

The 2009 report incorporated from the 2006 report the five specific kinds of criticism of Israel that should be considered as anti-Semitism (see above for a list of the five).

The report does not say all criticism of Israel is anti-Semitic:  "Abhorrence and protest against the policies, practices, and leaders of the Israeli state can be expressed in numerous forceful and trenchant ways, as they could against any other state - none of which would be antisemitic…", and "Drawing attention to the consequent harms in [playing the Nazi card against Israel] should not be intended, or taken, in any way as an attempt to suppress criticism of Israel and its military practices."

Antony Lerman criticized the report, and suggested that it could be used to suppress legitimate criticism of Israel, and suggests that the report's authors do not adequately address that possibility.

Objections to characterizing criticism of Israel as anti-Semitism
Some commentators have objected to the characterization of criticisms of Israel as anti-Semitic, and have often asserted that supporters of Israel equate criticism with anti-Semitism or excessively blur the distinction between the two.   Examples include Michael P. Prior, Noam Chomsky, Norman Finkelstein, Michael Lerner, Antony Lerman, Ralph Nader, Jenny Tonge, Ken Livingstone, and Desmond Tutu.    They provide a variety of reasons for their objections, including stifling free expression, promoting anti-Semitism, diluting genuine anti-Semitism, and alienating Jews from Judaism or Israel.

Vague and indiscriminate
Michael Lerner claims that the American Jewish community regularly tries to blur the distinction between legitimate criticism of Israel and anti-Semitism, and says it is a "slippery slope" to expand the definition of anti-Semitism to include legitimate criticism of Israel.

Philosophy professor Irfan Khawaja asserts that it is a "false equation" to equate anti-Zionism with anti-Semitism, writing "The point is not that the charge of 'anti-Semitism' should never be made: some people deserve it…. But the equation of anti-Semitism with anti-Zionism is a farce that has gone on long enough, and it’s time that those who saw through the farce said so…"

Palestine Monitor, a Palestinian advocacy group, is critical of what it characterizes as a modern trend to expand the definition of the term "antisemitic", and states that the new definitions are overly vague and allow for "indiscriminate accusations".

Brian Klug argues that anti-Zionism sometimes is a manifestation of antisemitism, but that "[t]hey are separate" and that to equate them is to incorrectly "conflate the Jewish state with the Jewish people."

Earl Raab, founding director of the Nathan Perlmutter Institute for Jewish Advocacy at Brandeis University writes that "[t]here is a new surge of antisemitism in the world, and much prejudice against Israel is driven by such antisemitism," but argues that charges of antisemitism based on anti-Israel opinions generally lack credibility. He writes that "a grave educational misdirection is imbedded in formulations suggesting that if we somehow get rid of antisemitism, we will get rid of anti-Israelism. This reduces the problems of prejudice against Israel to cartoon proportions." Raab describes prejudice against Israel as a "serious breach of morality and good sense," and argues that it is often a bridge to antisemitism, but distinguishes it from antisemitism as such.

Irfan Khawaja suggests that some legitimate criticisms of Israel are improperly attacked by deliberately conflating them with criticisms that are anti-Semitic in nature.

Alexander Cockburn and Jeffrey St. Clair, in the book The Politics of Anti-Semitism, write "Apologists for Israel's repression of Palestinians toss the word 'anti-Semite' at any critic of what Zionism has meant in practice for Palestinians on the receiving end.  So some of the essays in this book address the issue of what constitutes genuine anti-Semitism – Jew-hatred – as opposed to disingenuous, specious charges of 'anti-Semitism' hurled at rational appraisals of the state of Israel's political, military, and social conduct."

Represents Jews as victims
Norman Finkelstein and Steven Zipperstein (professor of Jewish Culture and History at Stanford University) suggest that criticism of Israel is sometimes inappropriately considered to be anti-Semitism due to an inclination to perceive Jews as victims.  Zipperstein suggests that the common attitude of seeing Jews as victims is sometimes implicitly transferred to the perception of Israel as a victim; while Finkelstein suggests that the depiction of Israel as a victim (as a "Jew among nations") is a deliberate ploy to stifle criticism of Israel.

"Self-hating" Jews

Sander Gilman has written, "One of the most recent forms of Jewish self-hatred is the virulent opposition to the existence of the State of Israel." He uses the term not against those who criticize Israel's policy, but against Jews who oppose Israel's existence.
Michael Lerner, editor of Tikkun magazine, asserts that the equation of Criticism of Israel with anti-Semitism has resulted in conflict within the Jewish community, in particular, proponents of the equation sometimes attack Jewish critics of Israeli policies as "self-hating Jews". Lerner also claims that the equation of Criticism of Israel with anti-Semitism and the resulting charges of "self hating Jew" has resulted in the alienation of young Jews from their faith.

Antony Lerman believes that many attacks on Jewish critics of Israel are "vitriolic, ad hominem and indiscriminate" and claims that anti-Zionism and anti-Semitism have been defined too broadly and without reason. Lerman also states that the "redefinition" of anti-Semitism to include anti-Zionism has caused Jews to attack other Jews, because many Jews are leaders in several anti-Zionist organizations.

Nicholas Saphir, Chair of the Board of Trustees of the New Israel Fund in the UK published an open letter defending non-governmental organizations (NGOs) that operate within Israel to promote civil rights. He said that several organisations such as NGO Monitor, Israel Resource News Agency, WorldNetDaily and the Near and Middle East Policy Review "associate moral and ethical criticism of any activity by Israel or the policies of its Government as being anti-Israel, anti-Semitic and when conducted by Jews, as evidence of self-hatred."

Scare tactics
The International Jewish Anti-Zionist Network is also opposed to the use of the antisemitic label to suppress criticism, and objected to the "fear tactics" employed when the anti-Semitic label was applied to supporters of Israel Apartheid Week, claiming that it was reminiscent of the anti-Communist scare tactics of the 1950s.

Michael Lerner suggests that some United States politicians are reluctant to criticise Israel because they are afraid of being labelled anti-Semitic. Lerner also states that groups that promote peace in the mid-East are afraid to form coalitions, lest they be discredited by what Lerner terms the "Jewish Establishment".

Draws attention away from genuine antisemitism
Brian Klug asserts that proponents of New Antisemitism define antisemitism so broadly that they deprive the term "antisemitism" of all meaning.   Klug writes: "... when anti-Semitism is everywhere, it is nowhere. And when every anti-Zionist is an anti-Semite, we no longer know how to recognize the real thing--the concept of anti-Semitism loses its significance."

In the book The Politics of Anti-Semitism Scott Handleman writes: "Partisans of Israel often make false accusations of anti-Semitism to silence Israel's critics. The 'antisemite' libel is harmful not only because it censors debate about Israel's racism and human rights abuses but because it trivializes the ugly history of Jew-hatred."

Excessive accusations of antisemitism may result in backlash
Brian Klug argues that excessive claims of anti-Semitism (leveled at critics of Israel) may backfire and contribute to anti-Semitism, and he writes "a McCarthyite tendency to see anti-Semites under every bed, arguably contributes to the climate of hostility toward Jews"

Tony Judt also suggests that Israel's "insistent identification" of criticism of Israel with anti-Semitism is now the leading source of anti-Jewish sentiment in the world.

Michael Lerner echos those thoughts and suggests that the continued "repression" of criticism of Israel may eventually "explode" in an outburst of genuine anti-Semitism.

Attacking the messenger rather than the message
Michael Lerner claims that some supporters of Israel refuse to discuss legitimate criticisms of Israel (such as comparisons with apartheid) and instead attack the people who raise such criticisms, thus deliberately "shifting the discourse to the legitimacy of the messenger and thus avoiding the substance of the criticisms".

Exaggerating the equation in order to draw sympathy
Alan Dershowitz distinguishes between legitimate criticism of Israel and anti-Semitism, but he claims that some "enemies of Israel" encourage the equation of the two, because it makes the enemies appear to be victims of false accusations of anti-Semitism, which the enemies use in an attempt to gain sympathy for their cause.

Suppression of criticism

A number of commentators have debated whether public criticism of Israel is suppressed outside of Israel, particularly within the United States. Stephen Zunes writes that "assaults on critics of Israeli policies have been more successful in limiting open debate, but this gagging censorship effect stems more from ignorance and liberal guilt than from any all-powerful Israel lobby." He goes on to explain that while "some criticism of Israel really is rooted in anti-Semitism," it is his opinion that some members of the Israel lobby cross the line by labeling intellectually honest critics of Israel as anti-Semitic. Zunes argues that the mainstream and conservative Jewish organizations have "created a climate of intimidation against many who speak out for peace and human rights or who support the Palestinians' right of self-determination." Zunes has been on the receiving end of this criticism himself: "As a result of my opposition to US support for the Israeli government's policies of occupation, colonization and repression, I have been deliberately misquoted, subjected to slander and libel, and falsely accused of being "anti-Semitic" and "supporting terrorism"; my children have been harassed and my university's administration has been bombarded with calls for my dismissal." In an opinion piece for The Guardian, Jimmy Carter wrote that mainstream American politics does not give equal time to the Palestinian side of the Israeli-Palestinian conflict and that this is due at least in part to AIPAC.  George Soros has claimed that there are risks associated with what was in his opinion a suppression of debate:"I do not subscribe to the myths propagated by enemies of Israel and I am not blaming Jews for anti-Semitism. Anti-Semitism predates the birth of Israel. Neither Israel's policies nor the critics of those policies should be held responsible for anti-Semitism. At the same time, I do believe that attitudes toward Israel are influenced by Israel's policies, and attitudes toward the Jewish community are influenced by the pro-Israel lobby's success in suppressing divergent views."

On the other hand, in his book, The Deadliest Lies, Abraham Foxman referred to the notion that the pro-Israel lobby is trying to censor criticism of Israel as a "canard." Foxman writes that the Jewish community is capable of telling the difference between legitimate criticism of Israel "and the demonization, delegitimization, and double standards employed against Israel that is either inherently anti-Semitic or generates an environment of anti-Semitism." Jonathan Rosenblum expressed similar thoughts: "Indeed, if there were an Israel lobby, and labeling all criticism of Israel as anti-Semitic were its tactic, the steady drumbeat of criticism of Israel on elite campuses and in the elite press would be the clearest proof of its inefficacy." Alan Dershowitz wrote that he welcomes "reasoned, contextual and comparative criticism of Israeli policies and actions." If one of the goals of the pro-Israel lobby was to censor criticism of Israel, Dershowitz writes, "it would prove that 'the Lobby' is a lot less powerful than the authors would have us believe."

Criticism stifled by accusations of antisemitism
Several commentators have asserted that supporters of Israel attempt to stifle legitimate criticism of Israel by unfairly labeling critics as antisemitic.

One of the major themes of Norman Finkelstein's book Beyond Chutzpah: On the Misuse of Anti-Semitism and the Abuse of History is that some supporters of Israel employ accusations of anti-Semitism to attack critics of Israel, with the goal of discrediting the critics and silencing the criticism. Professors Judy Rebick and Alan Sears, in response to Israel Apartheid Week activities at Carleton University, wrote an open letter to the University president which claimed that accusations of anti-Semitism are sometimes made with the goal of "silencing" criticism of Israel.

Journalist Peter Beaumont also claims that some proponents of the concept of New Antisemitism conflate criticism of Israel with anti-Semitism. Tariq Ali, a British-Pakistani historian and political activist, argues that the concept of new antisemitism amounts to an attempt to subvert the language in the interests of the State of Israel. He writes that the campaign against "the supposed new 'anti-semitism'" in modern Europe is a "cynical ploy on the part of the Israeli Government to seal off the Zionist state from any criticism of its regular and consistent brutality against the Palestinians. ... Criticism of Israel can not and should not be equated with anti-semitism." He argues that most pro-Palestinian, anti-Zionist groups that emerged after the Six-Day War were careful to observe the distinction between anti-Zionism and antisemitism.

Jewish Voice for Peace has spoken against what they see as the abuse of the antisemitic label. For example, in an opinion piece, they wrote "For decades, some leaders of the Jewish community have made the preposterous claim that there is complete unity of belief and interest between all Jews and the Israeli government, no matter what its policies. They must believe their own propaganda, because they see no difference between criticism of the Israeli government and anti-Semitism, and they do everything they can to silence critical voices. If the brand of anti-Semitism is not sufficiently intimidating, the silencing has been enforced by organized phone and letter-writing campaigns, boycotts, threats of, and actual withdrawal of funding support from 'offending' institutions and individuals."

Accusations are public relations efforts
John Mearsheimer and Stephen Walt claim that the accusations of anti-Semitism leveled at critics of Israel are deliberately timed to defuse the impact of the criticisms.  They suggest a pattern where accusations of antisemitism rise immediately following aggressive actions by Israel: following the Six-Day War, following the 1982 Lebanon War, and following exposure of "brutal behavior in the Occupied Territories" in 2002.

Norman Finkelstein says that to further a public relations campaign, apologists for Israel make accusations of what they call a "new anti-Semitism" against those they oppose, and that they do so deliberately in order to undermine critics and bolster the nation's image. Finkelstein also asserts that "American Jewish organizations" purposefully increase vocal accusations of anti-Semitism during episodes when Israel is coming under increased criticism (such as the during the Intifada), with the goal of discrediting critics of Israel.

Critics of Israel who have been accused of antisemitism
Critics of Israel who have been accused of antisemitism and have denied the allegation include Ralph Nader, John Mearsheimer, Cindy Sheehan, Jenny Tonge, Ken Livingstone, Desmond Tutu, and Helen Thomas.

Professor J. Lorand Matory is a vocal critic of Israel who supports disinvestment from Israel.  Larry Summers, president of Harvard, called efforts by Matory and others to divest from Israel "anti-Semitic in effect, if not intent."  According to Matory,  "the knee jerk accusation that targeted criticism of Israel singles out Israel is as absurd as stating that the anti-apartheid movement was singling out South Africa."

Professor Noam Chomsky argues that Israel's foreign minister Abba Eban equated anti-Zionism with anti-Semitism in an effort to "exploit anti-racist sentiment for political ends", citing statement Eban made in 1973: "One of the chief tasks of any dialogue with the Gentile world is to prove that the distinction between anti-Semitism and anti-Zionism is not a distinction at all." Commenting on Eban's statement, Chomsky replied: "That is a convenient stand. It cuts off a mere 100 percent of critical comment!" In 2002, Chomsky wrote that this equation of anti-Zionism with anti-Semitism was being extended to criticism of Israeli policies, not just criticism of Zionism. Chomsky also wrote that, when the critics of Israel are Jewish, the accusations of anti-Semitism involve descriptions of self-hatred. In 2004, Chomsky said "If you identify the country, the people, the culture with the rulers, accept the totalitarian doctrine, then yeah, it's anti-Semitic to criticize the Israeli policy, and anti-American to criticize the American policy, and it was anti-Soviet when the dissidents criticized Russian policy. You have to accept deeply totalitarian assumptions not to laugh at this." However, Oliver Kamm contends that Chomsky inaccurately interpreted Eban's comments.

Musician Roger Waters is a critic of Israel's treatment of Palestinians, and was accused by the ADL of using anti-Semitic imagery in one of his recent musical productions. Waters responded by stating that the ADL regularly portrays critics of Israel as anti-Semitic, and that "it is a screen they [the ADL] hide behind".

In 2002 Desmond Tutu is a critic of Israel who has compared Israel's policies to apartheid South Africa. Tutu wrote that criticism of Israel is suppressed in the United States, and that criticisms of Israel are "immediately dubbed anti-Semitic".

Michael Prior was a vocal critic of Israel's treatment of Palestinians, and who was frequently accused of anti-Semitism, yet he was careful to distinguish between anti-Zionism and anti-Semitism.

Ken Livingstone, former Mayor of London, was accused of antisemitism for a variety of comments, including remarks criticizing Israel's treatment of Palestinians. In response, Livingstone wrote "For 20 years Israeli governments have attempted to portray anyone who forcefully criticizes the policies of Israel as anti-semitic. The truth is the opposite: the same universal human values that recognize the Holocaust as the greatest racist crime of the 20th century require condemnation of the policies of successive Israeli governments – not on the absurd grounds that they are Nazi or equivalent to the Holocaust, but because ethnic cleansing, discrimination and terror are immoral."

Peace activist Cindy Sheehan claimed she has been improperly accused of being anti-Semitic because of her anti-war position, particularly her criticism of the Israel lobby and Israel's actions towards Palestinians. Sheehan emphasized that her criticism of Israel is "not to be construed as hatred of all Jews".

Critics that suggest censorship or suppression
Political scientists John Mearsheimer and Stephen Walt wrote an article critical of the Israel lobby in the United States, in which they asserted that the Israel lobby uses accusations of anti-Semitism as a part of a deliberate strategy to suppress criticism of Israel. Mearsheimer and Walt themselves were accused of anti-Semitism as a result of that article and the book they wrote based on the article.

Jenny Tonge, member of the UK House of Lords, has frequently criticized Israel's policies, and has been labelled antisemitic. In response, she said during a speech in Parliament:  "I'm beginning to understand ... the vindictive actions the Israel lobby [and] AIPAC ... take against people who oppose and criticize the lobby. ... [I understand] ... the constant accusations of antisemitism - when no such sentiment exists – to silence Israel's critics."

Ralph Nader, United States politician and consumer advocate, has criticized Israel's policies, expressed support for Palestinian causes, and criticized the excessive influence of the Israel lobby on the U.S. government. In response, Nader wrote a letter to the director of the Anti-Defamation League entitled "Criticizing Israel is Not Anti-Semitism" in which he said "Your mode of operation for years has been to make charges of racism or insinuation of racism designed to slander and evade. Because your pattern of making such charges, carefully calibrated for the occasion but of the same stigmatizing intent, has served to deter critical freedom of speech. ... The ADL should be working toward this objective [peace] and not trying to suppress realistic discourse on the subject with epithets and innuendos."

William I. Robinson, a professor at UCSB, was accused of being antisemitic due to a class assignment that revolved around Israel's attack on the Gaza strip, and he replied by stating that the Israel lobby labels "any criticism" of Israel as anti-Semitic In response, Robinson said: "The fact that I did include my interpretation of the Israeli–Palestinian conflict is totally within what is normal and expected. ... One of the most pressing affairs of January was the Israeli assault on Gaza – there was nothing that could be more relevant to this course at that time.  When you bring up delicate, sensitive, inflammatory, controversial material in the classroom, we as professors are carrying out our mission to jar students in order to challenge them to think critically about world issues. ... The Israel lobby is possibly the most powerful lobby in the United States, and what they do is label any criticism of anti-Israeli conduct and practices as anti-Semitic" Robinson said. "This campaign is not just an attempt to punish me. The Israel lobby is stepping up its vicious attacks on anyone who would speak out against Israeli policies."

Dr. Steven Salaita, an American expert on comparative literature and post-colonialism, became embroiled in a controversy regarding freedom of speech for faculty at American universities when his offer of employment was withdrawn from UIUC by Chancellor Dr. Phyllis Wise, a move some regard as an infringement on Salaita's freedom of speech. During the 2014 conflict between Israel and Gaza, he had published tweets that were seen as criticism of the Israeli government, and Salaita claims that as a result, pro-Israel advocates associated with the university accused him of anti-Semitism and pressured the university to rescind its offer of employment to him. As a result of his outspoken critique of the university's handling of his situation, Haaretz notes that Salaita has established "celebrity status on the lecture circuit." In November 2015, Salaita and UIUC reached a settlement which included a payment of $600,000 to Salaita and covering his attorney's costs; the university did not admit any wrongdoing.

Responses to criticism

Claims of media bias

Mudar Zahran, a Jordanian of Palestinian heritage, writes that the "tendency to blame Israel for everything" has provided Arab leaders an excuse to ignore the human rights of Palestinians in their countries. As an example, he said that while the world was furious over the blockade on Gaza, the media "chose to deliberately ignore" the conditions of the Palestinians living in refugee camps in Lebanon and other Arab countries.

George Will claims that the "blame Israel first (and last, and in between) brigade" is "large and growing".

Claims of United Nations bias
Alan Dershowitz, an American lawyer, claimed that the United Nations position was hypocritical, writing that the UN never condemned the annexation of Tibet by China or recognized the Tibetans' right to self-determination, also noting that China's occupation of Tibet has been longer, more brutal, deadlier and less justified than Israel's occupation of the West Bank and Gaza.

Foreign Ministry
The Israeli Ministry of Foreign Affairs has encouraged the use of social media to counteract criticism of Israel's policies. One member of the diplomatic corps proposed more aggressive action regarding Israel's critics. In June 2012, Israel's Channel 10 published an e-mail in which Nurit Tinari-Modai, deputy head of Israel's mission in Ireland and wife of the ambassador, Boaz Moda'i, proposed harassing expatriate Israelis who criticized Israeli policies, posting photos of them and publishing disinformation that would embarrass them. She claimed that they were critical of Israel because of their sexual identity. Following the publicity about Tinari-Modai's tactics, the Foreign Ministry quickly distanced itself from her letter. Her recommendation included the following :"You have to try and hit their soft underbellies, to publish their photographs, maybe that will cause embarrassment from their friends in Israel and their family, hoping that local activists would understand that they may actually be working on behalf of Mossad."

Israeli public opinion
International criticism is an important focus within Israel. According to an August 2010 survey by Tel Aviv University, more than half of Israelis believe "the whole world is against us", and three quarters of Israelis believe "that no matter what Israel does or how far it goes towards resolving the conflict with the Palestinians, the world will continue to criticize Israel". As a result, public diplomacy has been an important focus of Israeli governments since Independence. The Israeli Ministry of Public Diplomacy & Diaspora Affairs seeks to explain government policies and promote Israel in the face of what they consider negative press about Israel around the world.

Criminalization of Nazi comparisons
The EISCA Report recommends that the British government criminalize certain kinds of antisemitism, particularly use of the Nazi analogy to criticize Israel, as well as other forms of criticism of Israel.

Paul Craig Roberts and Antony Lerman have questioned the recommendations of the EISCA report, expressing concerns that the recommendations of the report may be adopted as a hate-crime law within Europe, which may lead to infringement of free speech, and may criminalize legitimate criticism of Israel.

Author Paul Craig Roberts is opposed to legislation in the United States will make it a crime to criticize Israel, and as examples he cites the Global Anti-Semitism Review Act of 2004 and the Hate Crimes Prevention Act of 2009. Roberts asserts that lobbyists for Israel are pressing for laws that will make it a crime to discuss the power of the Israel lobby, or to discuss alleged war crimes of Israel.

Antony Lerman criticized the 2009 EISCA report, and claims that criminalizing criticism of Israel (particularly, comparing Israel actions to Nazi actions) would constitute an excessive infringement of freedom of speech in Britain, postulating, for example, that "if you said 'the way the IDF operated in Gaza was like the way the SS acted in Poland', and a Jew found this offensive, hurtful or harmful, you could, in theory, go to jail."

Boycotts and divestment from Israel

Boycotts of Israel are economic and political cultural campaigns or actions that seek a selective or total cutting of ties with the State of Israel. Such campaigns are employed by those who challenge the legitimacy of Israel, Israel's policies or actions towards the Palestinians over the course of the Arab–Israeli and Israeli–Palestinian conflict, oppose Israeli territorial claims in the West Bank or Jerusalem or even oppose Israel's right to exist. Arab boycotts of Zionist institutions and Jewish businesses began before Israel's founding as a state. An official boycott was adopted by the Arab League almost immediately after the formation of the state of Israel in 1948, but is not fully implemented in practice.

Similar boycotts have been proposed outside the Arab world and the Muslim world. These boycotts comprise economic measures such as divestment; a consumer boycott of Israeli products or businesses that operate in Israel; a proposed academic boycott of Israeli universities and scholars; and a proposed boycott of Israeli cultural institutions or Israeli sport venues. Many advocates of the Boycott, Divestment and Sanctions (BDS) campaign, including Archbishop Desmond Tutu use the 1980s movement against South African apartheid as a model.

Disinvestment from Israel is a campaign conducted by religious and political entities which aims to use disinvestment to pressure the government of Israel to put "an end to the Israeli occupation of Palestinian territories captured during the 1967 military campaign."  The disinvestment campaign is related to other economic and political boycotts of Israel. A notable campaign was initiated in 2002 and endorsed by South African bishop Desmond Tutu. Tutu said that the campaign against Israel's occupation of the Palestinian territories and its continued settlement expansion should be modeled on the successful, but controversial, disinvestment campaign previously imposed against South Africa's apartheid system.

See also

 Anti-Zionism
 Bibliography of the Arab–Israeli conflict
 Religious relations in Israel

References

Citations

Sources

Ahlmark, Per, "Human Rights, Anti-Semitism, and The Wallenberg Legacy", in Nuremberg forty years later: the struggle against injustice in our time (International Human Rights Conference, November 1987 papers and proceedings), Irwin Cotler (Editor), McGill-Queen's Press - MQUP, 1995
Bruckner, Pascal, The tyranny of guilt: an essay on Western masochism, Princeton University Press, 2010
Buckley, William, In search of anti-Semitism, Continuum, 1992
Chesler, Phyllis, The new anti-semitism: the current crisis and what we must do about it, Jossey-Bass, 2003
Chomsky, Noam, Necessary Illusions: Thought Control in Democratic Societies,  House of Anansi, 2003
 
 Cohen, Patricia, "Essay Linking Liberal Jews and Anti_Semitism Sparks a Furor", The New York Times,  January 31, 2007, online
 Cotler, Irwin, "Human Rights and the new anti-jewishness", in Jerusalem Post, Feb 5, 2004
Dershowitz, Alan, The Case for Israel, John Wiley and Sons, 2003
Dershowitz, Alan, The Case Against Israel's Enemies: Exposing Jimmy Carter and Others Who Stand in the Way of Peace, John Wiley and Sons, 2009
Donskis, Leonidas, Troubled identity and the modern world, Macmillan, 2009
EISCA Report - by Igansky, Paul, and Sweiry, Abe, Understanding and Addressing the ‘Nazi Card' – Intervening Against Antisemitic Discourse, published by European Institute for the Study of Contemporary Antisemitism (EISCA), 2009, online.
Ellis, Marc, Judaism Does Not Equal Israel, The New Press, 2009
EUMC report – Antisemitism – Summary overview of the situation in the European Union 2001–2005 – Working Paper, Beate Winkler, European Monitoring Centre on Racism and Xenophobia (EUMC),  May 2006,  online.
 

Foxman, Abraham,  Never Again?, HarperCollins, 2004
Harrison, Bernard, The Resurgence of Anti-Semitism: Jews, Israel, and Liberal Opinion,  Rowman & Littlefield, 2006
Igansky, Paul, and Sweiry, Abe, Understanding and Addressing the ‘Nazi Card' – Intervening Against Antisemitic Discourse, published by European Institute for the Study of Contemporary Antisemitism (EISCA), 2009, online.  Cited as "EISCA  Report" (see above).
Igansky, Paul, and Kosmin, Barry (Eds), The New Antisemitism?: Debating Judeophobia in 21st-century Britain, Profile, 2003
Judt, Tony, "The Country That Wouldn't Grow Up", int Haaretz, 2 May 2006, online.
Klug, Brian, "The Myth of the New Anti-Semitism", in The Nation, posted January 15, 2004 (February 2, 2004 issue),   online,  accessed January 9, 2006.

Lerman, Antony, "Jews attacking Jews" in Haaretz, September 12, 2008,   online
Lerman, Antony "Should we ban 'Nazi analogies'? Using Nazi analogies to criticise Israel or Zionism may be offensive, but should it be against the law?", in Guardian, 24 July 2009, online
Lerner, Michael. There Is No New Anti-Semitism, posted February 5, 2007, accessed February 6, 2007.
Lowenstein, Antony, My Israel question, Melbourne Univ. Publishing, 2007
Perlmutter, Nathan,  The Real Anti-Semitism in America, Arbor House, 1982
Picciotto, Henri, On Criticism of Israel and Anti-Semitism, published by Jewish Voice for Peace, date unknown, online
Prior, Michael Speaking the Truth about Zionism and Israel, Melisende, 2004
Rosenbaum, Ron, Those who forget the past: the question of anti-Semitism, Random House, Inc., 2004
 Alvin H. Rosenfeld. 'Progressive' Jewish Thought and the New Anti-Semitism.  American Jewish Committee.  2006.
Schoenfeld, Gabriel, The Return of Anti-Semitism, Encounter Books, 2004
Sharan, Shlomo, and Bukay, David, Crossovers: Anti-Zionism and Anti-Semitism, Transaction Publishers, 2010

Zipperstein, Steven. "Historical Reflections of Contemporary Antisemitism" in Derek J. Penslar et al., ed., Contemporary Antisemitism: Canada and the World, Toronto: University of Toronto Press, 2005
Zuckerman, Mortimer, "The New Anti-Semitism", in U.S. News & World Report, 3 November 2003;

Anti-Zionism
Mass media about the Arab–Israeli conflict
Israeli foreign policy
Human rights in Israel